Princess Charlotte of Saxe-Hildburghausen (17 June 1787 Hildburghausen – 12 December 1847 Bamberg) was the child of Frederick, Duke of Saxe-Altenburg and his wife, Duchess Charlotte Georgine of Mecklenburg-Strelitz. She was the wife of Prince Paul of Wurttemberg and mother to his five children.

Early life
Charlotte was the eldest daughter of Frederick, Duke of Saxe-Altenburg, and his wife Duchess Charlotte Georgine of Mecklenburg-Strelitz. She was the second of twelve children. One of her godparents was Catherine the Great of Russia.

Along with her sisters, Therese and Louise, Charlotte was considered quite a beauty. Poet Friedrich Rückert dedicated one of his works, Mit drei Moosrosen, to these three young ladies. The title roughly translates to "Three Moss Roses".

Marriage and children
On 28 September 1805, she married Prince Paul of Wurttemberg in an extravagant wedding, but it was not a happy marriage. They had numerous arguments, and Paul was said to have many mistresses, with whom he had several affairs.  However, during their marriage, they had five children:

Princess Charlotte of Württemberg (1807–1873); married Grand Duke Michael Pavlovich of Russia, taking the name "Elena Pavlovna" upon her conversion to the Russian Orthodox Church.
Prince Frederick of Württemberg (1808–1870); married his cousin, Princess Catherine Frederica of Württemberg.
Prince Paul of Württemberg (1809–1810); died at an early age
Princess Pauline of Württemberg (1810–1856); married Wilhelm, Duke of Nassau
Prince August of Württemberg (1813–1885); married Marie Bethge

The couple separated soon after the birth of their fifth child. The idea of divorce was rejected by the King of Württemberg. Charlotte lived in a house called Sovereignty in Hildburghausen. Her eldest daughter, Princess Charlotte, visited her there quite often. Her brother, Frederick, was also a frequent visitor.

Charlotte died at the Royal Palace in Bamberg and is buried in the crypt of the House of Württemberg in Ludwigsburg.

Soon after Charlotte's death, Paul remarried. 
Charlotte was the maternal grandmother of Sofia of Nassau, who became the Queen Consort of Sweden (1872–1907).

Ancestry

References 

1787 births
1847 deaths
House of Saxe-Hildburghausen
Princesses of Württemberg
People from Hildburghausen
Princesses of Saxe-Hildburghausen
Princesses of Saxe-Altenburg
Daughters of monarchs